"Ghosts" is a song by British house music band Dirty Vegas. Included on their 2002 self-titled debut, it reached number 31 on the UK Singles Chart following its release on 22 July 2002.

Composition and style
The song was described as being "alt-leaning" and "uptempo" by Billboard. CMJ Music Monthly compared the song's style to that of the Pet Shop Boys.

Release
The song was released as the second single from the group's debut album on 22 July 2002 as a CD single and two 12-inch singles. The CD single includes the radio edit as well as two remixes; the enhanced portion of the disc features the song's music video. "Ghosts" debuted on the UK Singles Chart at number 31 on the chart dated 3 August 2002, spending two weeks in the top 50 and three weeks in the top 75. A remix of the song was later featured on their remix album, A Night at the Tables.

Music video
A music video for the song, featuring the trio in a car, driving past a body of water as people swim. Later in the video, the group is shown driving on desolate country roads. Singer Steve Smith, who is driving, receives a ticket from a police officer; Smith crumples up the ticket and drives on.

Charts

References

2002 singles
Dirty Vegas songs
Parlophone singles